The Deviants 3 is the third and final album by the UK underground group the Deviants, released in 1969.

Lead vocalist Mick Farren regards the album as the beginning of a divergence between himself and his fellow musicians, stating "I had one idea and the rest of them wanted to be a kind of Led Zeppelin guitar band". Soon after the band would split, with Farren going on to record the Mona – The Carnivorous Circus album. Farren eventually left the music business, while his ex-bandmates continued as the Pink Fairies.

Critical reception
Trouser Press called 3 "harder-rocking and spacier" than the previous albums. Perfect Sound Forever called the album "a much more consistent collection of songs than Disposable", writing that "musically, it tends to be more focused and you can hear that the playing is more solid, which can be good at times, but it also means that the musicians occasionally slip into bland '60's electric blues formalities". Uncut wrote that the Deviants "were beginning to sound like just another heavy rock band".

Track listing
All tracks arranged by The Deviants and composed by Paul Rudolph except where noted.
"Billy the Monster" – 3:26
"Broken Biscuits" – 2:10   (Duncan Sanderson, Paul Rudolph, Russell Hunter)
"First Line (Seven the Row)" – 2:44 (Duncan Sanderson)
"The People Suite" – 2:24  (The Deviants)
"Rambling B(l)ack Transit Blues" – 5:37
"Death of a Dream Machine" – 2:50
"Playtime" – 3:06
"Black George Does It with His Tongue" – 1:20
"The Junior Narco Rangers" – 0:28
"Lets Drink to the People" – 1:32
"Metamorphosis Exploration" – 8:57 (Duncan Sanderson, Paul Rudolph, Russell Hunter)

Personnel
The Deviants
Mick Farren – lead vocals, production
Paul Rudolph – guitar, vocals, mouth music
Duncan Sanderson – bass, vocals
Russell Hunter – percussion, vocals, stereo panning

Additional personnel
Tony Ferguson – organ
Tony Wiggens – equipment, lead vocal on "First Line"
David "Boss" Goodman – equipment, backing vocals
Jenny Ashworth – vocals

Technical personnel
Roy Thomas Baker – engineering
Victor Gamm – engineering
Keith Morris – photography

Recording
Recorded at Morgan Studios and Sound Techniques, London
Arrangements by The Deviants

Release history
September 1969, UK, Transatlantic Records, TRA204
1999, UK, Castle Communications, ESMCD746, with Mona – The Carnivorous Circus

References

External links
Collectable Records - Original cover

1969 albums
The Deviants (band) albums
Transatlantic Records albums